Systems medicine is an interdisciplinary field of study that looks at the systems of the human body as part of an integrated whole, incorporating biochemical, physiological, and environment interactions. Systems medicine draws on systems science and systems biology, and considers complex interactions within the human body in light of a patient's genomics, behavior and environment.

The earliest uses of the term systems medicine appeared in 1992, in an article on systems medicine and pharmacology by T. Kamada.

An important topic in systems medicine and systems biomedicine is the development of computational models that  describe disease progression and the effect of therapeutic interventions.

More recent approaches include the redefinition of disease phenotypes based on common mechanisms rather than symptoms. These provide then therapeutic targets including network pharmacology and drug repurposing. Since 2018, there is a dedicated scientific journal,  Systems Medicine.

Fundamental schools of systems medicine 
Essentially, the issues dealt with by systems medicine can be addressed in two basic ways, molecular (MSM) and organismal systems medicine (OSM):

Molecular systems medicine (MSM) 
This approach relies on omics technologies (genomics, proteomics, transcriptomics, phenomics, metabolomics etc.) and tries to understand physiological processes and the evolution of disease in a bottom-up strategy, i.e. by simulating, synthesising and integrating the description of molecular processes to deliver an explanation of an organ system or even the organism in its whole.

Organismal systems medicine (OSM) 
This branch of systems medicine, going back to the traditions of Ludwig von Bertalanffy's systems theory and biological cybernetics is a top-down strategy that starts with the description of large, complex processing structures (i.e. neural networks, feedback loops and other motifs) and tries to find sufficient and necessary conditions for the corresponding functional organisation on a molecular level.

A common challenge for both schools is the translation between the molecular and the organismal level. This can be achieved e.g. by affine subspace mapping and sensitivity analysis, but also requires some preparative steps on both ends of the epistemic gap.

Systems Medicine Education 
Georgetown University is the first in the Nation to launch a MS program in Systems Medicine. It has developed a rigorous curriculum, The programs have been developed and led by Dr. Sona Vasudevan, PhD.

https://systemsmedicine.georgetown.edu/

List of research groups

See also 
 Biocybernetics
 Medical cybernetics
 Systems biology
 Systems science

References 

Clinical medicine
Medicine
Concepts in alternative medicine
Evidence-based medicine
Health care
Medicine